

Teams

Venue

Background

Route to the final

Note: In all results below, the score of the finalist is given first.(H: home, A: away)

Match

Details

See also
 2021–22 Svenska Cupen

References

2022
Cup
Hammarby Fotboll matches
Malmö FF matches
May 2022 sports events in Sweden
Sports competitions in Stockholm
Association football penalty shoot-outs